Gérard Coignot (born 1936) is a French former swimmer. He competed in the men's 100 metre backstroke at the 1956 Summer Olympics.

References

External links
 

1936 births
Living people
French male backstroke swimmers
Olympic swimmers of France
Swimmers at the 1956 Summer Olympics
Place of birth missing (living people)
Swimmers at the 1955 Mediterranean Games
20th-century French people
21st-century French people